The 70th UWW European Wrestling Championships was held in Bucharest, Romania, between 8 and 14 April 2019.

Medal table

Team ranking

Medal summary

Men's freestyle

Men's Greco-Roman

Women's freestyle

References

External links
Official website
Results book

 
Europe
European Wrestling Championships
International wrestling competitions hosted by Romania
Sports competitions in Bucharest
2019 in Romanian sport
Wrestling Championships
European Wrestling Championships